Cascade Heights is an affluent neighborhood in southwest Atlanta. It is bisected by Cascade Road, which was known as the Sandtown Road in the nineteenth century. The road follows the path of the ancient Sandtown Trail which ran from Stone Mountain to the Creek village of Sandtown on the Chattahoochee River and from there on into Alabama. Ironically, the name lived on even after the Indians were expelled in the 1830s.

After the Indian cession, settlement came quickly, and several roads in the area bear the names of early pioneers, including Willis Mill Road, Childress Drive, Herring Road, Dodson Drive, Head Road, and Sewell Road, since rechristened Benjamin Mays Boulevard. Part of "Stone's District" in the nineteenth century, the area was dotted with small farms of white farming families, only a few of which were also home to enslaved African Americans. By the time of the Civil War there was a post office at Utoy where the Sandtown Road crossed Utoy Creek but no real community center aside from the post office, churches, and mills. Utoy Primitive Baptist Church and Mt. Gilead Methodist Church were both organized in 1824 and flourished throughout the nineteenth and into the twentieth century. In the nineteenth century, the revival camp meetings held at Mt. Gilead campground near Ben Hill from 1835 until 1989 drew thousands from all denominations in the area. Willis' Mill on the south fork of Utoy Creek and Herring's Mill on the north fork were critical for not only grinding corn and sawing lumber, but also for the chance to socialize. A cotton gin also operated on a site just west of what is now the Cascade Nature Preserve, and it also would have been a place that nearly everyone in the area used at one time or another.

In early 1864, as the prospect of invasion by the Union army became real, defensive works were built that encircled Atlanta a mile and a half or so from the city center. As the Confederate army was pushed steadily before General Sherman's army in the spring of 1864, there were frantic attempts to extend the fortifications, including one line built southwest of the city along the Sandtown Road. After the Confederate defeat at Kennesaw Mountain, the Union army's crossing of the Chattahoochee River in early July was followed by three awful battles fought later that month: the Battle of Peachtree Creek, north of the city, the so-called Battle of Atlanta on the east, and the Battle of Ezra Church on the west on July 27. During August, as Union artillery laid siege to the city, there were skirmishes all around the southwest side of the city as Sherman attempted to complete his encirclement of the city. On August 4–7, the Union and Confederate armies met at the Battle of Utoy Creek, fought in and around what is now the Cascade Nature Preserve. Union losses were put at 850, and the Confederate line held with a loss of only 35 killed, wounded, or missing.

The area remained mostly rural farmland throughout the nineteenth century, Cascade Springs was one of several sites around the city hoping to cash in on the rising middle class. Ponce de Leon Springs was the most successful perhaps, but in the springs near the old ford for the Sandtown Road over Turkeyfoot Creek was the genesis of Cascade Heights, or simply Cascade. The springs were christened "Cascade" after the three small waterfalls that spill away from the road, now in the northeast corner of the Cascade Spring Nature Preserve. A small resort developed there in the late nineteenth and early twentieth centuries. Very little remains besides an exceptionally fine spring house sheltering the original spring.

Today the term Cascade, much like the term Midtown, can refer to a much larger area than what might be shown on official maps. Generally today Cascade might be bounded by I-20 on the north, I-285 on the west, the ridges on the south side of Utoy Creek, and the pre-1954 city limits around Greenwood Cemetery. In the period between the world wars, Adams Park and Beecher Hills began to develop, and after World War II, explosive suburban growth produced Audubon Forest, Peyton Forest, West Manor, Sewell Manor, and Mangum Manor as the old farms in this part of Fulton County were subdivided and developed in the 1950s. In 1953, the area was annexed into the City of Atlanta.

Peyton Road Affair 

In the early 1960s the area was a predominantly white neighborhood. After an African-American physician (Dr. Clinton E. Warner) bought a home in Peyton Forest, white residents in the area feared that their neighborhood would become a victim of blockbusting, a business practice in which real estate agents would profit from the racial fears of white residents while changing the racial makeup of a white residential area. When African Americans moved into a neighborhood, many whites believed that property values would automatically plunge, which was a self-fulfilling prophecy as so many homes went on the market at the same time as whites fled first West End and then Cascade Heights, Adams Park, and most of the rest of southwest Atlanta. Real estate agents stirred up racial tension and benefited from the commissions they earned when fearful homeowners sold their properties, often at a loss, in order to escape the area.

In an infamous 1962–63 episode that came to be called "the Peyton Road Affair", Atlanta mayor Ivan Allen responded to residents' fears of blockbusting by directing city staff to erect barricades on Peyton Road and Harlan Road to restrict access to Cascade Heights, thus preventing African-American homeseekers from getting to the neighborhood from Gordon Road (now MLK Drive). He took the action at the urging of white residents of southwest Atlanta (in particular, one of his high-level employees who lived a short distance from Peyton Road). After the barricades went up, December 18, 1962, the incident quickly drew national attention. The barrier was compared to the Berlin Wall and nicknamed the "Atlanta Wall". Some newspapers in other parts of the country questioned Atlanta's motto "the City Too Busy to Hate". The walls were torn down when, on March 1, 1963, a court ruled them to be unconstitutional. White homeowners fled the neighborhood after the barricades were removed. By the end of July 1963, only 15 white homeowners remained in Peyton Forest.

By the late 1960s the Cascade Heights neighborhood was predominantly African-American but, in spite of the fears of some whites, little had changed in Cascade except the color of the residents. In the 1970s, the area became home to many of the movers and shakers in the city's African American community and it remains so today. It is, in many ways, a mirror of the much-vaunted white neighborhoods in northwest Atlanta, with notable celebrities in residence, several gated communities, and flanked by two golf courses.

Notable people
Notable current and former residents of Cascade Heights include:
 Maynard Jackson (1938–2003), the first African American mayor of Atlanta
 Former Atlanta mayor Shirley Franklin 
 Former UN Ambassador and Atlanta mayor Andrew Young
 John Lewis (1940–2020), civil rights leader and congressman 
 Baseball legend Hank Aaron (1934–2021)
 Benjamin Mays, Ph.D. (1894–1984), president of Morehouse College from 1940–1967
 Dr. Hamilton Holmes (1945–1995), one of two African Americans to integrated the University of Georgia
 Dr. Clint Warner, M.D. (1924–2012), surgeon and former chief of staff of Southwest Community Hospital, one of the first medical centers in the nation owned or operated by African Americans
 Ozell Sutton, past national president of Alpha Phi Alpha fraternity and founding member of the National Center for Missing and Exploited Children 
 Dr. Howard W. Grant, Ph.D., Executive Director/Administrator of the Atlanta Board of Education 
Kandi Burruss, singer/songwriter, record producer, and cast member of The Real Housewives of Atlanta 
 Major Harry R. "Bob" Kerr, president of the Pearl Harbor Survivors Association; and, Joseph Suttles, former grand master of the Masonic Lodge of Georgia and great-grandson of Revolutionary War soldier and early Atlanta settler William Suttles in 1820.

References

Neighborhoods in Atlanta